Gothic Kingdom or Kingdom of the Goths (Gutþiuda Þiudinassus)  

 Ostrogothic Kingdom in Italy
 Visigothic Kingdom in Spain

See also 
 Gothia (disambiguation)